Jan Jelínek (born 22 March 1982) is a former Czech professional football player and manager, who was in lead of FC Trinity Zlín. His playing position is defender. He made his Czech First League debut for Zlín against Olomouc on 20 March 2005.

References

1982 births
Living people
Czech footballers
Czech First League players
FC Fastav Zlín players
Association football defenders
FC Fastav Zlín managers
Czech football managers
Czech First League managers